Caulastrocecis perexigella is a moth of the family Gelechiidae. It is found in Russia (the southern Ural).

The wingspan is 8.5–9.5 mm. The forewings are evenly mixed with whitish and brown-tipped scales except the costa, which is unicolorous whitish. The hindwings are pale fuscous.

Etymology
The species name is derived from Latin perexiguus (meaning very small) and refers to the small size of the moth.

References

Moths described in 2010
Caulastrocecis